Demissie Wolde (born 8 March 1937) is an Ethiopian former marathon runner. He won the Košice Peace Marathon in 1969 in 2:15:37. He also competed in the 1964 Olympic marathon, having qualified by running 2:19:30 on 3 August for 3rd place, in the Ethiopian Olympic trials, a race held at 8,000 feet. After being among the leaders for much of the 1964 Olympic race, he finished tenth in 2:21:25.2. At the 1972 Summer Olympics, he placed 18th in 2:20:44.0 in the marathon. He is the younger brother of Mamo Wolde who dropped out of the race in 1964, won the Olympic Marathon in 1968, and who finished 3rd in 1972.

References

1937 births
Living people
Ethiopian male long-distance runners
Ethiopian male marathon runners
Olympic athletes of Ethiopia
Athletes (track and field) at the 1964 Summer Olympics
Athletes (track and field) at the 1972 Summer Olympics
20th-century Ethiopian people
21st-century Ethiopian people